Danny the Street is a fictional character appearing in comics of the DC Universe. Danny is a living and sentient piece of urban geography who can magically and seamlessly place himself in any urban landscape at will without any disruption to his surroundings. He can freely interact with any other sapient being through various forms of visual printing within his proximity.

The character was created by Grant Morrison and Richard Case and first appeared in Doom Patrol #35 (August 1990). Morrison's character was described as a transvestite male – a street with macho establishments like a gun shop, a hardware store and an Army/Navy store, but elaborately decorated with frills, flowers and fairy lights. Danny communicated through text on signs, in a "camp" lingo studded with Polari phrases. 
This has been discussed as part of Morrison's intention to "deconstruct notions of heroic masculinity" in Doom Patrol.

Danny the Street appeared on the first three seasons of the Doom Patrol television series for DC Universe and HBO Max, portrayed as genderqueer, using "they/them" pronouns. Critics have remarked on the positive portrayal of a non-binary character in a superhero show as emotionally fulfilling for viewers who identify as queer.

Fictional character biography
Danny is a stretch of roadway who has long served as a home and haven for the strange, outcast and dispossessed. He possesses superpowers, including the ability to teleport by integrating into a city's geography; roads and buildings simply make room for him. He does this mostly at night, when no one is looking. Danny travels the globe, and sometimes beyond, happily seeking out people and communities in need of shelter, safety and community. Thus, it is possible to turn a corner on the way to work, and find oneself walking down Danny's roadway. Danny once teleported into the City Under The Pentagon and can teleport into the wilderness when needed.

Danny's flamboyant personality and propensity for cross-dressing is evidenced when he lines his street with typically masculine stores (e.g. gun shops and sporting goods stores) decorated with frilly pink curtains and lace. Danny speaks by altering his form. For example, he communicates with signs in his windows, messages on typewriters, and with letters formed from manhole vapor or broken glass shards. Danny speaks English, heavily flavored with Polari, a largely antiquated form of slang spoken among certain British subcultures, including some of the LGBTQ community.  ("Good to see you") is his favorite way of greeting friends. His personality is based, at least partially, on Irish drag performer Danny La Rue. Danny is kind, compassionate, quick to joke and slow to anger. If pushed past his limits, however, he can even the score by manipulating his environment.

Danny first came in contact with the Doom Patrol when he and his residents were attacked by Darren Jones and the Men from N.O.W.H.E.R.E. Jones' obsession with normalcy and with enforcing his "1950s sit-com" worldview, made Danny an obvious target. The struggle took Danny to downtown New York City, where the Doom Patrol investigated the disturbance. They worked hard to protect Danny and his residents, but it was ultimately the members of Danny the Street's Perpetual Cabaret who defeated Jones. In addition to the Doom Patrol and the Perpetual Cabaret, Danny housed Flex Mentallo, protecting the hero during the mental breakdown that followed his first and only failure.

Evolution
Eventually, Danny left the DC Universe, and inhabited an alternate Earth. Pledging to protect and nurture the needy of all dimensions, he became Danny the World. Danny's friend, former Doom Patrol member Crazy Jane, later became a resident of Danny the World.

In the pages of Teen Titans, during the One Year Later time-shift event in the DC Universe, a portal to Danny was seen in Dayton Manor; Crazy Jane was also seen through the portal.

Danny was leveled in Doom Patrol (vol. 5) #7 by Mister Somebody Enterprises. Crazy Jane managed to escape the destruction and fled to Oolong Island, carrying with her a brick taken from one of Danny's buildings which contained Danny's sentience – effectively making him Danny the Brick.

The New 52
In The New 52 reboot of DC's continuity, Danny is re-introduced in Teen Titans (vol. 4) #3 (January 2012). He becomes a full member of the team and as a teenager himself, spies for Red Robin.

During the cross-over event "The Culling", Danny is presumed dead by the group. They find that he did not die and is on a mysterious island with them in Teen Titans (vol. 4) #10, but he later dies during the strain of returning the rest of the group to civilization. It was suggested he survived as "Danny the Alley".

DC Rebirth
Danny shows up in DC Rebirth in Gerard Way's iteration of the Doom Patrol. He is revealed to have reverted to Danny the Brick and is now only able to make words appear on his surface. Danny the Brick tours the universe, carried by Crazy Jane. The two then meet a man named "D" who uses Danny to kill a god. After this, Danny is able to become Danny the World; however, he does not pick up outcasts but instead creates his own citizens.

Upon Danny getting strong enough to become an otherworldly amusement park called Dannyland, he makes his comic book character Casey "Space Case" Brink from Danny Comics become real to see what she would be like on earth. Danny later contacts Casey because the Vectra are hunting him, an evil alien race that wants to use him to make meat for fast food restaurants, and wants her to reassemble the Doom Patrol. He contacts her by becoming Danny the Ambulance. Casey and the Doom Patrol save Danny the World and defeat the Vectra, and Danny becomes a member of the new team.

While Danny is acting as Danny the Ambulance, he still runs the ever-growing Danny the World.

Development
In a 2020 interview, Morrison said that they understands why Danny is a popular character on the Doom Patrol television series,

Powers and abilities
Danny the Street can teleport. He is a living pocket dimension that can incorporate more and more space as he gains more residents. He can create any conceivable thing (living or inanimate) as long as he has the strength.

In other media
 In Titans episode "Doom Patrol", the Doom Patrol mansion is located on "Danny Street".
 Danny the Street first appeared in the DC Universe live-action television series Doom Patrol eighth episode, "Danny Patrol". Danny is described as a "sentient, genderqueer, teleporting street" who is on the run from the Bureau of Normalcy. In the episode "Frances Patrol", Danny leaves Cyborg and Crazy Jane a clue that leads them to Flex Mentallo. Danny later agrees to help the Doom Patrol locate the villain Mr. Nobody despite being afraid of him, but is later captured by latter and manages to teleport the Doom Patrol to Doom Manor so that they can rescue Danny and the Chief's daughter from Mr. Nobody. After Ezekiel the Cockroach and Admiral Whiskers the Rat exploded, Danny was reduced to a brick with the inscription "Danny Brick Co." In season two, Dorothy Spinner first split apart and then repaired Danny's brick. She later turned them into a tire when Danny shares their sentiment. In season three, Danny is revealed to have become an ambulance as they take Dorothy to bury the Chief's body. When Cliff, Rita, Vic and Jane all end up dead, Danny summons the Dead Boy Detectives to help Larry and Dorothy revive them.
 Danny the Street appears as a summonable character in Scribblenauts Unmasked: A DC Comics Adventure.

References

DC Comics characters
DC Comics characters who are shapeshifters
DC Comics characters who can teleport
DC Comics dimensions
DC Comics LGBT superheroes
DC Comics locations
Fictional characters with elemental transmutation abilities
Fictional characters with dimensional travel abilities
Fictional streets and roads
Comics characters introduced in 1990
Characters created by Grant Morrison
Fictional non-binary people
Fictional LGBT characters in television